Vern Leroy Bullough (July 24, 1928 – June 21, 2006) was an American historian and sexologist.

He was a distinguished professor emeritus at the State University of New York (SUNY) at Buffalo, Faculty President at California State University, Northridge, a past president of the Society for the Scientific Study of Sexuality, past Dean of natural and social sciences at the Buffalo State College in Buffalo, New York, one of the founders of the American Association for the History of Nursing, and a member of the editorial board of Paidika: The Journal of Paedophilia.

Biography
Born in Salt Lake City, Utah, Bullough earned his A.B. at the University of Utah in 1951. He then attended the University of Chicago, earning an A.M. in 1951 and a Ph.D in 1954, and was a university fellow during 1953-1954. In 1981 he received a B.S.N. from California State University, Long Beach.

According to the university:
He is the author, co-author, or editor of nearly 50 books, has contributed chapters to another 75 or so, and has over 100 refereed articles, and hundreds of more popular ones. His expertise encompasses several fields: sexology, history, community health and public policy, contraception and population issues. He has lectured in most of the 50 states and 20 or so foreign countries including China, Russia, Greece, Egypt, Ghana, et al. Among his many awards is the Alfred Kinsey Award for distinguished sex research.

He began teaching at Youngstown University, where he was an Assistant Professor of History and Social Science from 1954-1959. He then moved to California State University, Northridge in 1959, and was promoted to Associate Professor in 1962, and to Professor in 1965.

In 1992 Bullough received a Distinguished Humanist Service Award from the International Humanist and Ethical Union (IHEU), and served as co-Chairman of the IHEU (1995-1996). In 2003 he was one of the signers of the Humanist Manifesto. Today Bullough is remembered mainly as an eminent sexologist and medical historian, and a pioneer in the scientific study of alternative sexual behaviors. He was married first to Bonnie Bullough and had five children, the oldest of whom died in childhood in Egypt in 1967. After the death of Bonnie Bullough in 1996 he married Gwen Brewer. He died in Westlake Village in 2006.

Legacy
Bullough's archives reside at the University Library at California State University, Northridge, where an endowment in his name funds special lectures, scholarships, and collection development in sex and gender studies.

References

Further reading

Pearce, Jeremy (July 3, 2006). Vern Leroy Bullough, 77, Noted Medical Historian, Dies. New York Times
Clive M Davis. In Memoriam: Vern L. Bullough, Ph.D., DSci, RN. Journal of Sex Research. New York: Feb 2007. Vol.44, Iss. 1;  pg. 1

Published works
1977: A Bibliography of Prostitution. New York: Garland (with others)
1982: Sexual Practices and the Medieval Church. New York: Prometheus Books 
1994: Human sexuality: an encyclopedia. New York: Garland
2004: Universities, Medicine and Science in the Medieval West, Ashgate

External links 
 

1928 births
2006 deaths
20th-century American historians
20th-century American male writers
Historians of LGBT topics
American LGBT rights activists
Writers from Salt Lake City
American sexologists
University of Chicago alumni
University of Utah alumni
California State University, Long Beach alumni
University at Buffalo faculty
American male non-fiction writers